South Coast is an electoral district of the Legislative Assembly in the Australian state of New South Wales. It is represented by Shelley Hancock of the Liberal Party. It incorporates almost all of the City of Shoalhaven to the south of the Shoalhaven river, notably Nowra, Ulladulla and Milton.

Members for South Coast

Election results

References

External links

South Coast
Constituencies established in 1927
1927 establishments in Australia